Barcelona: A Love Untold is a 2016 Philippine romance drama film, directed by Olivia Lamasan, starring Kathryn Bernardo and Daniel Padilla. The film was produced and released by Star Cinema and was released on September 14, 2016.

The film was awarded Best Picture at the 65th FAMAS Awards in 2017.

Synopsis
Ely (Daniel Padilla) can't get over his past love. In Barcelona, he juggles work with his studies as he aims to get his master's degree. He then meets Mia (Kathryn Bernardo), a girl who sees Spain as a fresh start. After a series of mistakes in the past, she abruptly uproots herself from life in the Philippines to move forward and start anew. But the question is how?

Cast

Main cast

Kathryn Bernardo as Mia Dela Torre / Celine Antipala
Daniel Padilla as John Elias "Ely" Antonio

Supporting Cast
Aiko Melendez as Insiang, Ely's aunt
Joey Marquez as Caloy Antonio, Ely's father
Joshua Garcia as Tonying, Ely's cousin
Ricky Davao as Robert dela Torre, Mia's father
Maria Isabel Lopez as Belinda Alfaro, Ely's mother

Extended Cast
Ana Capri as Jane Antonio, Ely's stepmother
Cris Villanueva as Benjamin "Ben" Antipala, Celine's father
Liza Diño-Seguerra as Clara Antipala, Celine's mother
Ana Abad Santos as Mary Anne dela Torre, Mia's mother
Melizza Jimenez as Macky dela Torre, Mia's younger sister
Kathleen Hermosa as Monina dela Torre, Mia's older sister

Special Participation

 CX Navarro as Ely's stepbrother
 John Bermundo as Ely's stepbrother
 Dianne Medina as Flor, OFW recruiter in Spain
 Lei Andrei Navarro as young Ely
 Faye Alhambra as young Celine/Mia
 Patrick Sugui as Lorenz, Ely's friend
 Ignacio Rivera as The Matador
 Marta Soberano as The Flamenco Bride
 Oscar Alfaro as the Spanish Dad
 Emilio Perez as Ely's Spanish half-brother
 Sophia Ysm as Ely's Spanish half-sister - No longer in contract
 Vince San Juan as Vince, Ely's co-worker in Barcelona
 Rianne Salvo Castro as Lorena, Mia's workmate at the Sitges resort
 Matias Cobain as Jose Antonio
 Nuria Casas as Mia's landlady
 Maria Sagan as Maria, the Filipina singer - No longer in contract
 RJ Placino as Arjay, Ely's employer
 Antonio Sousa da Costa as the Waiter, Plaça Real
 Maine Censon as Dorothy
 Min Bernardo as a Barcelona Señora
 Christina Sanchez Elloo as Christina, Ely's classmate - No longer in contract
Nel Closa as Audience
Jerome Aguzar as Tourist in Sagrada Familia

Cameo Appearances

 Cathy Garcia-Molina as Prenup Director

Soundtrack
The theme song of the film, "I'll Never Love This Way Again", was originally sung by Dionne Warwick. There are two versions of the song: one was covered by Gary Valenciano and also by Jona.

Release
The film was released on September 14, 2016 initially in 230 cinemas and was expanded to 250 cinemas for its second day and eventually in 320 cinemas for its succeeding days. The film was screened in the United States and Canada starting September 23, 2016 in 69 cinemas. It earned approximately $434,000 in its first 3 days of showing in North America. After 10 days, it had earned $1,100,000. In its first weekend, the movie made $182,952 in the UAE, with a total gross of $229,849 after 3 weeks of showing. In Australia and New Zealand, it made $41,585 on its first weekend of screening, with a total gross of $59,000 after 2 weeks of screening.

Due to popular demand, it was extended up to four weeks in the USA, Canada, UAE, Australia and in Barcelona.

Critical reception
Oggs Cruz of Rappler gave a mixed review, calling it "a beautiful film" but also "dull and ineffective" and that it "feels too mechanical, too designed to work." Yet he complimented the "overflowing" musical score. Philbert Ortiz Dy of ClickTheCity.com rated the film 2 out of 5 stars, saying "the [film] is just oddly constructed all around. There’s just so much to address, and the movie just doesn’t seem willing to do the work to give all these issues the time they need." Nazamel Tabares, a movie blogger for Movies Philippines, also rated the film 2 stars out of 5, saying that "there’s nothing new in the film and nothing worth keeping after seeing." Je C.C. of Philippine Entertainment Portal said of the film, "Still falling into the pitfalls of Star Cinema cliches, Barcelona: A Love Untold becomes a film of blemished beauty, but that is fine." On the other hand, Rod Magaru, an entertainment blogger, rated the film 9 out of 10 and called it a "masterpiece of 2016." He commended Carmi Raymundo for the way she wrote the flashbacks and added that "it is one of her best." Edmund Silvestre, New York correspondent for Philstar Global Entertainment wrote, "Barcelona is an enchanting (and hit) tearjerker."

A film review published in Bandera of Philippine Daily Inquirer noted that Barcelona: A Love Untold is not just a kilig movie, giving it 8 out of 10 points. Maureen Marie Belmonte of Push said Barcelona: A Love Untold marks a new era for Kathryn and Daniel because it makes moviegoers appreciate them not just as a bankable love team, but also as bona fide dramatic actors who have successfully gotten past their teenybopper roles.

Box office
The film earned ₱23 million on its first day of showing surpassing Imagine You and Me for the highest opening-day gross for a Filipino film for the year. The film earned 130 million pesos on its fifth day of showing. On its twelfth day of release, the film earned a total of 200 million pesos. By 4 October, the film had already grossed at least ₱300 million.

The film gross ₱321 million as of 8 October

Accolades

See also
 List of highest-grossing Filipino films of all time
 Top 10 Grossing Philippine Films of 2016

References

External links 

Barcelona A Love Untold on Star Cinema website

Films shot in Barcelona
Films set in Barcelona
Philippine romantic drama films
2016 films
Star Cinema films
2016 romantic drama films
Films directed by Olivia Lamasan